DW-TV is a German multilingual TV news network of Deutsche Welle. Focussing on news and informational programming, it first started broadcasting 1 April 1992. DW broadcasts on satellite and is uplinked from Berlin. DW's English broadcast service is aimed at an international audience.

History
DW (TV) began as RIAS-TV, a television station launched by RIAS, a West Berlin broadcaster in August 1988. The fall of the Berlin Wall the following year and German reunification in 1990 led to the closure of RIAS-TV. On 1 April 1992, Deutsche Welle inherited RIAS-TV's broadcast facilities, using them to start a German and English-language television channel broadcast via satellite, DW (TV), adding a short Spanish broadcast segment the following year. In 1995, it began 24-hour operation (12 hours in German, 10 hours in English, two hours in Spanish). At that time, DW (TV) introduced a new news studio and a new logo.

In 2001, Deutsche Welle (in conjunction with ARD and ZDF) founded a  subscription TV channel for North American viewers called German TV. The project was shut down after four years due to low subscriber numbers. It was replaced by the DW-TV channel, which is also a subscription service.

Unlike most other international broadcasters, DW-TV doesn't charge terrestrial stations for use of its programming, and as a result its News Journal and other programmes are rebroadcast on numerous public broadcasting stations in several countries, including the United States, Australia, and New Zealand. In the Philippines, some English-language programmes are broadcast nationwide on Net 25 and PTV 4. In the U.S., some of its programs were distributed via the World Channel as well as MHz Worldview, although after the closure of MHz Worldview in 2020, a few stations have since offered a full carriage of DW-TV.

In March 2009, DW-TV expanded its television services in Asia with two new channels: DW-TV Asia and DW-TV Asia+. DW-TV Asia (DW-TV Asien in German) broadcasts 16 hours of German programming and eight hours in English while DW-TV Asia+ broadcasts 18 hours of English programmes plus six hours of German programmes.

In August 2009, DW-TV ceased broadcasts on Sky channel 794 in the United Kingdom.  The channel continues to be available via other satellites receivable in the UK.

Deutsche Welle relaunched their television channels and their schedules on 6 February 2012, using the abbreviation DW for all its services.

Deutsche Welle changed its schedules again on 22 June 2015, with DW in Asia and Oceania and DW (Europe) merged to become a 24-hour English news channel.  English programmes on DW (Arabia) and DW (Español) were discontinued.

Logos

Reception
DW-TV is broadcast via the AsiaSat 7, GSAT-15, Nilesat 102, Atlantic Bird 3, Hot Bird 13B, AMC-1 and Intelsat 9 satellites.

DW-TV is also available on the Internet and on Digital terrestrial television in a handful of cities in the United States.

Satellite jamming
A transponder on Hot Bird 8, used by DW-TV among other stations, was jammed on 7 and 8 December 2009. Eutelsat, the operator of the satellite localised the emitter source in Iran. The same happened between 10 and 13 February 2010.

Programmes
All programme names given in this article are the ones currently used on DW English and DW German website.

Business
Made in Germany (German business magazine)

Sports
Kick Off! (football)
Drive It! (motor magazine) (Motormobil in German)
The Bundesliga (German football highlights)

Arts and culture
Arts.21 (culture Kultur.21 in German)
Kino ("The German Film Magazine"/Das Deutsche Filmmagazin)
Treasures of the World (Schätze der Welt in German)
Ideas for a Cooler World, for climate change mitigation

Documentaries and features
Close Up (current affairs documentaries, Nahaufnahme in German)
World Stories (current affairs; weekly)
Faith Matters 
DocFilm or DokFilm (documentaries and reports; formerly called In Focus and Documentaries in English or Im Focus & Dokumentation in German)
Germany 60 Years (60 x Deutschland in German; no longer broadcast)
The Climate Cover Up - Big Oil's Campaign of Deception (2018); New documents confirm big oil companies have known the burning of fossil fuels impacts climate since 1957.
Worldlink

Lifestyle and entertainment
Euromaxx (European lifestyle)
popXport (German music)
Sarah's Music (contemporary classical)
Europe in Concert
Germany Today (Deutschland Heute in German) *
Check-In (German travel tuide)
Talking Germany *
Living in Germany (Typisch deutsch in German)*
Discover Germany (German travel magazine, Hin & Weg in German)*

* Program is no longer broadcast

News and politics
DW News
The Day (Der Tag in German)
Conflict Zone — with Tim Sebastian
European Journal
heute
Phoenix Der Tag
People & Politics (Politik Direkt in German)*

Talk shows
To the Point (formerly Quadriga)
Agenda (Discontinued in December 2014)

Health, science and environment
In Good Shape (Health programme,  in German)
Shift (Living in Digital Age)
Tomorrow Today (Projekt Zukunft in German)
Global 3000 (Covers globalization)
Eco@Africa (Also known as Eco-at-Africa, Africa's Environment Magazine)

Channels
As of 13 April 2018, DW (TV) operates five channels:
DW (English): Broadcast in Europe, Africa, Asia, Oceania and North America (24 hours in English).
DW (Arabia): Broadcast in the Middle East, North Africa, and select countries in Europe (24 hours in Arabic).
DW (Español): Broadcast in Latin America (24 hours in Spanish).
DW (Deutsch+): Broadcast in the Americas (20 hours in German, 4 hours in English).
DW (Deutsch): Broadcast in Asia-Pacific (24 hours in German).

The channel DW (Arabia 2) stopped broadcasting on the Astra 1M satellite on 15 December 2017, but continues to broadcast on the Nilesat and Badr4 satellites, which reach both the Middle East and Europe. DW Arabic is aimed at Arabic speakers who had come to Europe as refugees, and residents of the Middle East.

References

External links

 
 DW frequencies
 DW-TV live stream

ARD (broadcaster)
Television stations in Berlin
Cable television in Hong Kong
Foreign television channels broadcasting in the United Kingdom
English-language television stations
German-language television networks
Arabic-language television stations
Television channels in North Macedonia
Television channels and stations established in 1992
1992 establishments in Germany
24-hour television news channels in Germany
Multilingual news services
Deutsche Welle